Midhordland or Midthordland is a traditional district in the Vestlandet region of Norway.  It consists of the central-west portion of the old Hordaland county (now part of Vestland county), mostly including the islands and coastal fjord areas surrounding (and including) the Bergen Peninsula.  It includes the city on Bergen and the surrounding municipalities of Askøy, Austevoll, Bjørnafjorden, Samnanger, and Øygarden.  The region is dominated by its largest city, Bergen, which is also the second largest city in the country.  

There are no administrative functions for this district, it is simply a cultural and historical area. Until 2014, the Church of Norway had a deanery called Midhordland prosti, but that has since been dissolved and its churches transferred to other neighboring deaneries.

Municipalities of Midhordland

Geography 

 Tallest mountain: Tveitakvitingen (1299,1 m), Bjørnafjorden

 Largest lake (area): Skogseidvatnet (5,3 km²), Bjørnafjorden
 Largest island: Sotra (178,6 km²)

References

Districts of Vestland
Askøy
Austevoll
Bjørnafjorden
Samnanger
Øygarden